Boyd is an unincorporated community in southeastern New Hampton Township in Chickasaw County, in the U.S. state of Iowa.

History
 A post office was established at Boyd in 1890, and remained in operation until 1908. Boyd had a depot on the Chicago Great Western Railroad. Boyd's population was 54 in 1902, and 55 in 1925.

References

Unincorporated communities in Chickasaw County, Iowa
Unincorporated communities in Iowa